The On the Run II Tour was the second co-headlining stadium tour by American singer Beyoncé and rapper Jay-Z. The tour began on June 6, 2018, in Cardiff and ended on October 4, 2018, in Seattle. This is their first tour together since On the Run Tour in 2014.

Commercial performance

Billboard stated the tour could double the On the Run Tour's gross, predicting it could gross between $180 million and $200 million, if the success of the previous tour is replicated.

Following the first day of general sale, an extra show was added in Amsterdam, after the first date sold out within an hour, as well as in Paris, Landover, East Rutherford, Chicago, Atlanta, Houston, Pasadena and London. Newly added shows were also announced on March 20, in Columbus, Columbia, Seattle, and London.

Billboard ranked On the Run II Tour as the 3rd-highest-grossing tour of the year, selling over 2,177,049 tickets and grossing over $253 million.

Critical response

The opening show in Cardiff received positive reviews. Mark Sutherland from Rolling Stone gave the opening show in Cardiff a positive review. He called it a sort of reaffirmation of dominance for the pair as they deliver a "a hits-packed, visually stunning show". Writing for The Guardian, Rachel Aroesti awarded the concert four out of five stars and noted that the concept of the show revolved around the singers showing the "deathless nature of their love rather than its perfection". Beyoncé was critiqued after some of her "biggest hits" were left out of the set list on the opening night, including "Halo" and "Single Ladies (Put a Ring on It)". However, with over 60 songs rehearsed for the tour, the set list was believed to change between shows.
Bonginkosi Tshabalala of No Name publications added that the show at Houston proved that "no matter what happens LOVE wins".

Set list
{{hidden
| headercss = background: #CECEF2; font-size: 100%; width: 75%;
| contentcss = text-align: left; font-size: 100%; width: 95%;
| header = Europe
| content = This set list is representative of the June 6 show in Cardiff, Wales.

 "Holy Grail" 
"Part II (On the Run)"
"'03 Bonnie & Clyde" 
"Drunk in Love"
"Diva" / "Irreplaceable" 
"Clique" / "Everybody Mad"
"Dirt off Your Shoulder"
"On to the Next One"
"FuckWithMeYouKnowIGotIt" / "Flawless"
"Feeling Myself"
"Top Off"
"Naughty Girl"
"Big Pimpin'"
"Run This Town"
"Baby Boy" 
"You Don't Love Me (No, No, No)"
"Bam" / "Hold Up"
"Countdown"
"Sorry" / "Me, Myself and I"
"99 Problems"
"Ring the Alarm"
"Don't Hurt Yourself"
"I Care"
"4:44"
"No Church in the Wild"
"Song Cry"
"Resentment"
"Family Feud"
"Upgrade U"
"Niggas in Paris"
"Beach Is Better"
"Formation"
"Run the World (Girls)"
"Public Service Announcement"
"The Story of O.J."
"Déjà Vu"
"Show Me What You Got"
"Crazy in Love"
"Freedom"
"U Don't Know"
Encore
"Young Forever"
"Perfect Duet"
}}
{{hidden
| headercss = background: #CECEF2; font-size: 100%; width: 75%;
| contentcss = text-align: left; font-size: 100%; width: 95%;
| header = North America 
| content = This set list is representative of the October 4 show in Seattle, Washington.

"Holy Grail"
"Part II (On the Run)"
"'03 Bonnie & Clyde"
"Drunk in Love"
"Diva"
"Clique"
"Dirt Off Your Shoulder"
"On to the Next One"
"FuckWithMeYouKnowIGotIt"
"Flawless (Remix)"
"Feeling Myself"
"Naughty Girl"
"Big Pimpin'"
"Nice"
"Run This Town"
"Baby Boy"
"Mi Gente (Remix)" / "Mine
"Black Effect"
"Countdown"
"Sorry"
"99 Problems"
"Ring the Alarm"
"Don't Hurt Yourself"
"I Care"
"4:44"
"Song Cry"
"Resentment"
"Family Feud" 
"Upgrade U"
"Niggas in Paris"
"Beach Is Better"
"Formation"
"Run the World (Girls)"
"Public Service Announcement"
"The Story of O.J."
"Déjà Vu"
"Show Me What You Got"
"Crazy in Love"
"Freedom"
"U Don't Know"
Encore
"Young Forever"
"Perfect Duet"
"Apeshit"
}}

Shows

Personnel

Creative direction and executive producers
Jay-Z and Beyoncé – creative director and executive producer
Ed Burke – creative director
Todd Tourso – additional creative direction
Erin Williams – executive producer
Mark A. Ritchie – live video director

Musical arrangement
JAY-Z
Beyoncé
Derek Dixie
Omar Edwards
Chris Grant
Gimel Keaton
Stuart White

Band
 Lauren Taniel – bass
 Dammo Farmer The Great – bass
 Agape Woodlyn – guitars
 Eric "Boots/Booty" Greene – drums, percussion
 Joy Williams – drums, percussion
 Quintin Gulledge – keyboards
 DJ Guru – DJ
 1500 Or Nothin 
 Crystal Torres – trumpet
 Chris (T-Bone Chris) Johnson – trombone
 Lessie Vonner – trumpet
 Mike Jones – sousaphone 
 Corbin Jones – sousaphone
 Chris Grey – trumpet

Background vocalists
Tiffany Moníque Ryan – lead background vocalist
Ashley D. Hobson
Whitney Howard
Jerome "J Rome" Wayne

Choreography
Chris Grant
JaQuel Knight
Vincent Stevenson

Additional choreography
Dana Foglia
Sidi Larbi Cherkaoui
Jasmine Badie
Frank Gatson Jr.
Jamal Rasheed
Ashanti Ledon
Dnay Baptiste 
Sheryl Murakami 
Les Twins
Tanisha Scott
LaVelle Smith

Dancers
Ashley Everett – dance captain
Kimberly "Kimmie" Gipson – dance captain
Jasmine Badie

Dnay Baptiste
Bianca Brewton
Hannah Douglass
Jasmine Harper
Corbin Hunter
Dominique Loude
Tacir Roberson
Deijah Robinson
Ashley Seldon
Quinetta Wilmington
Rameer Colon
Lazaedryn Gordwin
Habby Jacques
Huwer "Havoc" Marche
Jo'Artis "Big Mijo" Ratti
Britton Shaw
Nicholas "Slick" Stewart

See also 
 List of highest-grossing concert tours

References

 

2018 concert tours
Beyoncé concert tours
Jay-Z concert tours
Co-headlining concert tours